Ring Christmas Bells was recorded during the Mormon Tabernacle Choir's 2008 Christmas shows in the LDS Conference Center with special guests Brian Stokes Mitchell and Edward Herrmann.  The album was released on August 31, 2009 along with a concert DVD.  A recording of the concert aired on PBS in December 2009.

Track listing

Charts

Year-end charts

References

Tabernacle Choir albums
2009 Christmas albums
Christmas albums by American artists